Wikstroemia techinensis is a shrub in the family Thymelaeaceae.  It is found in China, specifically Yunnan.

Description
The shrub grows to a height of up to 1.5 meters.  It grows flowers in clusters of 2 to 4, which bloom during summer.  Its fruit is unseen.  It grows at an altitude of around 3400 meters.

References

techinensis